The spotted chorus frog or Clark's tree frog (Pseudacris clarkii) is a small, nocturnal tree frog native to the grasslands and prairies of the central United States and Tamaulipas, Mexico. It is found from central Kansas, Oklahoma, and northeastern New Mexico to the Gulf of Mexico and Rio Grande valley in Texas and Tamaulipas.

Description 
Spotted chorus frogs are generally a grey or olive green in color, with lighter green mottling on their backs, and white in color on their undersides. They grow to a maximum of 1.25 inches (about 3–4 cm).

References 

  Database entry includes a range map and justification for why this species is of least concern. IUCN RangeMap:
Amphibian Species of the World: Pseudacris clarkii
Herps of Texas: Pseudacris clarkii

External links
"Pseudacris clarkii" photo; Article Frogs and Toads Found in Texas
Spotted Chorus Frog, Pseudacris clarkii photo-Med Res; Article eNature-(with SoundTrack of species)

Chorus frogs
Amphibians of Mexico
Amphibians of the United States
Fauna of the Plains-Midwest (United States)
Fauna of the Rio Grande valleys
Amphibians described in 1854
Taxa named by Spencer Fullerton Baird